Prunus serrula, called birch bark cherry, birchbark cherry, paperbark cherry, or Tibetan cherry, is a species of cherry native to China, and is used as an ornamental in many parts of the world for its striking coppery-red bark.

Description

The leaves are arranged alternately, simple, 5–10 cm long and 1.5–2.0 cm broad and a serrate margin. The smooth bark is a brownish red, with prominent horizontal lenticels. The outer layer of the bark is remarkably tough, approaching the strength of Mylar.

Flowers
The flowers, typical of Prunus, are produced in clusters of one to three. The fruit is a small oval bright red drupe.

Cultivation

Prunus serrula is grown as an ornamental tree, especially for winter interest. It tolerates a variety of soil types and has a wide pH range. It prefers full sun and does well in USDA hardiness zones 5 to 8. Its potential as an invasive species is low, as it is susceptible to many common garden diseases and pests such as fire blight, powdery mildew and Japanese beetles.

It is sometimes grafted to Prunus serrulata (Japanese cherry) crowns, forming a tree with red bark and showier flowers.

In 2012 the 'Branklyn' variety gained the Royal Horticultural Society’s Award of Garden Merit.

References

External links
 

serrula
Cherries
Trees of China
Flora of Asia
Ornamental trees